Tony Declan James Slattery (born 9 November 1959) is an English actor and comedian. He appeared on British television regularly from the mid-1980s, most notably as a regular on the Channel 4 improvisation show Whose Line Is It Anyway?  His serious and comedic film work has included roles in The Crying Game, Peter's Friends and How to Get Ahead in Advertising.

Early life and education

In 2019 Slattery revealed that he had been repeatedly sexually abused by a priest at the age of eight, but had never told his parents; he believes the event contributed to his unstable character later in life. He was educated at Gunnersbury Boys' Grammar School in west London and won a scholarship to read Modern and Medieval Languages at Trinity Hall, Cambridge, specialising in French literature and Spanish poetry. Slattery held a black belt in judo and represented England internationally in the under-15s.

At the University of Cambridge, Slattery discovered a love of the theatre, taking delight in making people laugh. He met Stephen Fry, who invited him to join the Cambridge Footlights. Other members at that time included Hugh Laurie, Emma Thompson, Sandi Toksvig, Jan Ravens and Richard Vranch.

In 1981, Slattery, Fry, Laurie, Thompson and Toksvig won the inaugural Perrier Award for their revue The Cellar Tapes. The following year, Slattery was made President of the Footlights. During his tenure, the touring annual revue was Premises Premises.

Television and film
Slattery first broke into television as a regular performer on Chris Tarrant's follow up to O.T.T., Saturday Stayback (1983), while also appearing for children in Behind the Bike Sheds and the Saturday-morning show TX. By 1989 he was a regular on Whose Line Is It Anyway?, starred in his own improvisational comedy series, S&M, alongside Mike McShane, and appeared on other panel quizzes such as Have I Got News for You. He was a regular on the TV version of the quiz show Just a Minute and was also on the radio version several times, including the live version held at the Edinburgh Festival.

As a dramatic actor he has appeared in The Crying Game, To Die For, Peter's Friends and The Wedding Tackle.

At the end of the 1980s he became a film critic, presenting his own show on British television, Saturday Night at the Movies. He also appeared in the ITV sitcom That's Love with Jimmy Mulville. Other TV appearances include The Music Game alongside Richard Vranch and as a regular guest with both Ruby Wax and Clive Anderson. In 1988, Slattery appeared in the BBC sci-fi comedy series Red Dwarf, in the episode "Kryten" he played the voice of the main character on Kryten's favourite soap opera, "Androids", a parody of the Australian soap opera Neighbours.

He has also been a regular guest with the Comedy Store Players, both at the Comedy Store in London and on tour.

Early in the 1990s he appeared on many TV shows to the extent that he was a target of satire. For example, the Have I Got News for You 1991 annual showed images of the game from around the world, and each local variant featured Slattery as a guest. Spitting Image showed a sketch in which an anthropomorphised BBC2 logo refused to have blue paint splattered on it and Slattery intervened for the sake of publicity. The satirical magazine Private Eye once published a memorable cartoon depicting his answering machine with the outgoing message "Yes, I'll do it!"

In 1990, he appeared as a contestant on Cluedo, facing off against David Yip. From 1993 to 1994 he was the host of the game show Trivial Pursuit.

In 1992 he appeared in the film Carry On Columbus. In the same year he appeared in the series Dead Ringer, filmed for the observation round in The Krypton Factor. Also in 1992 Slattery appeared as a contestant on the Channel 4 show GamesMaster, in which he said that he hated video games. He played the real-time arcade shooter Who Shot Johnny Rock?, deliberately failing the challenge by shooting an innocent victim in the game.

In 1993 he starred in the ITV sitcom Just a Gigolo.

In 1994, Slattery auditioned for the title role in the then upcoming revival of Doctor Who.

Personal problems later overshadowed Slattery's career, leading to a reduced profile. Due to an extended period of illness, he undertook only occasional television work from the mid-1990s to the early 2000s. He reappeared in Red Dwarf in 1999 as the voice of a vending machine that threatens Arnold Rimmer in the final episode of the series' initial BBC2 run, "Only the Good...".

The year 2005 was a busy one for Slattery. He appeared in the TV film Ahead of the Class with Julie Walters, portrayed D.I. Alan Hayes in series 7 of Bad Girls, and made a cameo appearance in ITV's Life Begins as a date for Maggie (played by Caroline Quentin).  Also that year, Slattery won a celebrity edition of the game show The Weakest Link, beating Vanessa Feltz in the final round. At the end of the show, he announced that he would donate his prize money to the Terrence Higgins Trust. In December 2005, he joined the long-running drama Coronation Street as Eric Talford

In April 2006, Slattery appeared in Grumpy Old Men on BBC Two. In 2007, he played Tom O'Driscoll in the feature film Lady Godiva: Back in the Saddle, and the Canon of Birkley in the Robin Hood episode "Show Me the Money". That year, Slattery also joined the ITV series Kingdom as a regular cast member, playing the eccentric Sidney Snell, to which he returned for a third series in 2009. In January 2010, he appeared with Phyllida Law on Ready Steady Cook.

In March 2011, Slattery appeared in a reunion special of Whose Line Is It Anyway? along with David Walliams, Josie Lawrence, Clive Anderson, Humphrey Ker and Neil Mullarkey for the BBC Comic Relief show 24-Hour Panel People.

In May 2020 Slattery and partner Hutchinson were featured in an edition of the BBC Horizon series entitled "What's the Matter with Tony Slattery?", which examines a diagnosis of bipolar disorder with specialist Guy Goodwin. In the programme Slattery meets with consultant psychiatrist Ciaran Mulholland who suggests that Slattery continues to suffer from the effects of the trauma suffered in his childhood abuse. Goodwin concludes that Slattery should be judged to be on the bi-polar spectrum, but that his main challenge is his alcohol dependence. The programme ends positively with Slattery reducing his alcohol intake and being able to accept that he can take steps to improve his mental health.

Theatre and comedy
In 1981 he teamed with Richard Vranch as a comedic duo calling themselves "Aftertaste".  For a number of years they toured throughout Great Britain performing in small venues: theatres and clubs, most notably the Tunnel Club, King's Head Theatre in London and aboard the Thekla, then known as the "Old Profanity Showboat" in Bristol. Together they hosted the Channel 4 quiz The Music Game and over 100 episodes of Cue the Music on ITV.

Possessing a baritone voice, Slattery has appeared on London's West End stages in the musicals Me and My Girl and Radio Times, as well as in the play Neville's Island.

In 1994, Slattery became a founding patron of Leicester Comedy Festival alongside Norman Wisdom, appearing at the first festival in 1996 and again in 2020.

In May 2006 he was the first voice of the narrator in the 35th anniversary theatre production of Richard O'Brien's Rocky Horror Tribute Show, held at the Royal Court Theatre, just downstairs from the first ever showing of Rocky Horror.

On 20–22 and 24 July 2010, he appeared in Ki Longfellow-Stanshall and Vivian Stanshall's Stinkfoot in Concert, once again performing aboard the Thekla still moored in Bristol docks.

In 2014, Slattery appeared in the Oxford Jericho "Name in the Hat" revue alongside Kriss Akabusi.

Personal life
In the mid-1990s, after leaving Whose Line Is It Anyway?, Slattery suffered what he described as a "midlife crisis"; triggered by cocaine use and excessive drinking. Slattery says he does not remember how much he spent on cocaine but "would not be surprised" if media reports that he spent £4,000 per week on the drug were accurate.

In 1996 Slattery's crisis culminated with a six-month period as a recluse, during which he did not answer his door or telephone, "or open bills, or wash... I just sat." Eventually, one of his friends broke down the door of his flat and persuaded him to go to hospital. He was diagnosed with bipolar disorder. He discussed this period and his subsequent living with the disorder in a documentary made by Stephen Fry, The Secret Life of the Manic Depressive, in 2006; Slattery claimed that he spent time living in a warehouse and "throwing [his] furniture into the Thames."

In May 1998 he was elected as Rector of the University of Dundee, however his poor attendance record with a single visit in a one-year period led to calls for his resignation from students. The official view was that it would not be worthwhile ousting him, because his term would end in February 2001.

He has said: "I'm happily described as gay," and has been in a relationship with the actor Mark Michael Hutchinson since 1986.

In March 2019 he held a Comedy Gala in Hoylake, Merseyside to raise money for a charity close to his heart, Bipolar UK. The night included sets from a variety of comedians.

In September 2020 Slattery signed a publishing deal to write his memoirs.

References

External links
 

1959 births
Male actors from London
Alumni of Trinity Hall, Cambridge
English male judoka
English male comedians
English male film actors
English people of Irish descent
English male soap opera actors
English male voice actors
English gay actors
Gay comedians
Living people
Rectors of the University of Dundee
People with bipolar disorder
British LGBT comedians